Saint Anthony (Liberia) is a football club based in Monrovia Liberia.

The team plays in Liberian Third Division.

Stadium
Their home Stadium is the Blue Field Sports Ground.

References

External links

Football clubs in Liberia
Sport in Monrovia